Red Rose is the second studio album by Taiwanese singer Elva Hsiao, released on 15 August 2000 by Virgin Records Taiwan. The songs, "My Exciting Solitary Life" and "Rose", reached number fifteen and forty-three respectively on Hit FM Annual Top 100 Singles in 2000.

Track listing

References

External links

2000 albums
Elva Hsiao albums